The 2006 Men's Pan-American Volleyball Cup was the first edition of the annual men's volleyball tournament, played by seven countries from June 3 to June 12, 2006 in Tijuana and Mexicali, Mexico. The event served as a qualifier for the 2007 America's Cup in Brazil, where the top three teams will join the teams from Argentina and Brazil. The winner of each pool automatically advanced to the semi-finals and the teams placed in second and third met in crossed matches in the quarterfinals round.

Competing nations

Squads

Preliminary round

Group A
Monday June 5

Tuesday June 6

Wednesday June 7

Group B
Monday June 5

Tuesday June 6

Wednesday June 7

Final round

Quarterfinals
Friday June 9, 2006

Semi-finals
Saturday June 10, 2006

Finals
Sunday June 11, 2006 — Seventh Place Match

Saturday June 10, 2006 — Fifth Place Match

Sunday June 11, 2006 — Bronze Medal Match

Sunday June 11, 2006 — Gold Medal Match

Final ranking

United States, Dominican Republic and Canada qualified for the 2007 Volleyball America's Cup

Awards

Most Valuable Player
  Elvis Contreras
Best Spiker
  José Martell
Best Scorer
  Elvis Contreras
Best Defender
  Richard Lambourne
Best Setter
  Cristian Cruz
Best Server
  Rolando Junquin
Best Libero
  Carlos Velásquez
Best Blocker
  Murray Grapentine

References
 Results

Men's Pan-American Volleyball Cup
Men's Pan-American Volleyball Cup
Men's Pan-American Volleyball Cup
Volleyball
Men's Pan-American Volleyball Cup